Hugo Moser  (Buenos Aires, April 14, 1926 – Buenos Aires, December 16, 2003) was an Argentine television/film producer and screenwriter. In 1977 he directed Basta de mujeres.

Moser died on December 16, 2003, at the age of 77, after a long disease.

References

External links
 Hugo Moser at cinenacional.com
 
 

1926 births
2003 deaths
Argentine film directors